The 2022–23 Wake Forest Demon Deacons women's basketball team represents Wake Forest University during the 2022–23 NCAA Division I women's basketball season. The Demon Deacons are led by first-year head coach Megan Gebbia, compete as members of the Atlantic Coast Conference and play their home games at the Lawrence Joel Veterans Memorial Coliseum.

Prior to the season, Wake Forest fired head coach Jen Hoover after ten seasons.  Megan Gebbia was announced as the new head coach on May 26, 2022.

Previous season

The Demon Deacons finished the season 16–17 overall and 4–14 in ACC play to finish in a tie for eleventh place. As the eleventh seed in the ACC tournament, they defeated fourteenth seed Virginia in the First Round before losing to sixth seed Georgia Tech in the Second Round. They received an at-large bid to the WNIT.

Off-season

Departures

Recruiting Class

Source:

Roster

Schedule

Source:

|-
!colspan=6 style=| Exhibition

|-
!colspan=6 style=| Regular Season

|-
!colspan=6 style=| ACC Women's Tournament

|-
!colspan=6 style=| WNIT

Rankings

Coaches did not release a Week 2 poll and AP does not release a final poll.

See also
 2021–22 Wake Forest Demon Deacons men's basketball team

References

Wake Forest Demon Deacons women's basketball seasons
Wake Forest
Wake Forest women's basketball
Wake Forest women's basketball
2023 Women's National Invitation Tournament participants